Somerset High School may refer to:

Somerset Berkley Regional High School in Somerset, Massachusetts
Somerset High School (Bellflower, California) in Bellflower, California
Somerset High School (Kentucky) in Somerset, Kentucky
Somerset High School (Texas) in Somerset, Texas
Somerset High School (Wisconsin) in Somerset, Wisconsin